Leah Gerber is a Professor of Conservation Science and founding director of the Center for Biodiversity Outcomes at Arizona State University. She looks to inform policy and sustain the biodiversity of the world's oceans. She serves on the Arizona State University President's Council on Women in Leadership.

Early life and education 
Gerber studied environmental science at Mills College. She earned her bachelor's degree in 1992 before moving to Seattle to continue her studies. Gerber studied marine policy at the University of Washington. She earned a master's degree in 1993 and a doctoral degree in wildlife ecology in 1998. Her thesis looked at how to make decisions about endangered species and was supported by the National Oceanic and Atmospheric Administration. She joined the National Center for Ecological Analysis and Synthesis as a postdoctoral researcher, where she looked at recovery of endangered species and design of marine reserves. She was awarded tenure at Arizona State University in 2001.

Research and career 
Gerber is an Aldo Leopold Leadership Fellow and Professor of Conservation Science at Arizona State University. She established the Arizona State University Center for Biodiversity Outcomes in 2014. The Center works with researchers from across the university, looking to encourage discoveries that conserve and sustain biodiversity. Gerber has established new approaches for academic and public engagement and is a National Science Foundation Science of Science and Innovation Policy program grant holder. Gerber combines the theories of behavioural ecology with quantitative approaches of demography to examine how reproductive behaviour impacts the extinction risks of Zalophus californianus. She has also analysed the health and sustainability of seafood, and organised a series of events to educate the general public in how to make more environmentally friendly choices.

Whilst governmental funding is available to protect biodiversity, it is insufficient and not distributed evenly amongst different species. Gerber showed that more than quarter of investment into protecting species goes to only 139 of 1,124 plants and animals. She has evaluated whether funding should be used to maximise the recovery of species or to prevent species' extinction. This question is riddled with moral complexity; whether it is ethically sound to abandon species with little hope of recovery, or how to avoid missing opportunities to prevent extinction. She has worked with the National Science Foundation and the United States Fish and Wildlife Service to create a tool to compare funding allocations and the consequences of resource allocation strategies. The Recovery Prioritization Explorer was created as part of a SESYNC Endangered Species Act Decision Support Venture.

In 2017 Gerber moved to Ecuador as a Fulbright Program scholar in the Universidad San Francisco de Quito. Here she looked to understand how local people promote and protect biodiversity. She focussed on incentives to protect wildlife in the Galápagos Islands. She serves on the Intergovernmental Science-Policy Platform on Biodiversity and Ecosystem Services. Together they published a global assessment of biodiversity, evaluating the world's status in relation to the Sustainable Development Goals, Aichi Biodiversity Targets and Paris Agreement. She is concerned about the impact of the Trump Administration on the United States Environmental Protection Agency.

Selected publications 
 
 
 

Gerber has written for The Conversation.

Personal life 
Gerber is married with two children. When she was pregnant with her first daughter, Arizona State University did not have a maternity leave policy, and instead of maternity leave she had to take sick leave.

References 

Living people
American women academics
American conservationists
American women scientists
Mills College alumni
University of Washington College of the Environment alumni
Arizona State University faculty
Year of birth missing (living people)
21st-century American women